Malpi International School was established in June 1999 in Nepal. The school was conceptualized by the idea of a group of 50 professionals and was designed by Architects Deepak Man Sherchan and Jyoti Shrechan ( Creative Builders Collaborative, CBC architectural firm). Currently the school is headed by the principal Chandrayan Shrestha.

Location
Malpi International School is located in Panauti village, just beside the Roshi River (Malpi-9, Panauti, Kavre, Panauti 00977, Nepal).

References

Schools in Nepal
Boarding schools in Nepal
1999 establishments in Nepal